The Basque Wikipedia ( or Euskal Wikipedia) is the Basque language edition of Wikipedia. Founded on December 6, 2001, although its main page was created in November 2003, it reached 58,124 articles by August 19, 2010, making it the 45th-largest Wikipedia.

History 
In an August 2007 interview, Jimmy Wales, co-founder of Wikipedia, used the Basque Wikipedia as an example of the rationale for having Wikipedias in smaller languages:
"Certainly within Wikipedia right now we are seeing some fairly successful projects in small European languages. You don't really need a Welsh language Wikipedia, perhaps. The number of people who speak Welsh who don't also speak English is very small and getting smaller every year. So why do we have a Welsh Wikipedia? Well, people wanted it, so they're making it. And language preservation is the main motive. It is their mother tongue and they want to keep it alive, keep its literature alive. Certainly some of the larger small languages like Basque and Catalan have very successful projects. I definitely see that preserving parts of your language and culture through collaborative projects makes a lot of sense."

On January 25, 2008, the Basque Wikipedia was awarded the Argia Saria granted by the magazine Argia in the category of Internet.

On May 21, 2011, Basque Wikipedia published its 100,000 article, an article about the prohibition of using Basque language throughout history called Euskararen debekua. In December 2011, around 11,000 new articles were added to Basque Wikipedia by the Culture Ministry of the Basque Government.

Txikipedia 
In 2018, the Basque Wikipedia started a sub-project where articles were aimed at children, named Txikipedia ("txiki" being Basque for "small"). It was inspired by an independent French project named . Two years after the launch, the project had 2,600 articles, most being focused on maths and natural sciences.

Statistics
As of February 2012, the Basque Wikipedia has the second greatest number of articles per speaker among Wikipedias with over 100,000 articles, and ranks sixth overall. These figures were based on Ethnologues estimate of 665,800 Basque speakers.

New articles per day
 November 8, 2010: 456 articles
 December 20, 2009: 239 articles
 October 8, 2009: 219 articles
 August 30, 2009: 141 articles
 October 7, 2009: 134 articles
 October 11, 2009: 125 articles
 October 9, 2009: 118 articles
 October 13, 2009: 115 articles

Gallery

See also
 French Wikipedia
 Spanish Wikipedia

References

External links

  Basque Wikipedia
  Basque Wikipedia mobile version
  Txikipedia

Basque-language websites
Wikipedias by language
Internet properties established in 2001
European encyclopedias